Steel Wheels is the 19th British (and 21st American) studio album by the English rock band the Rolling Stones, released on 25 August 1989 in the US and on 11 September in the UK. It was the final album of new material that the band would record for Columbia Records.

Hailed as a major comeback upon its release, Steel Wheels is notable for the patching up of the working relationship between Mick Jagger and Keith Richards, a reversion to a more classic style of music and the launching of the band's biggest world tour to date. It is also the final full-length studio album to involve long-time bassist Bill Wyman, preceding the announcement of his departure in January 1993. Wyman's final tenure with the band would be on two studio tracks for the 1991 album Flashpoint. Steel Wheels was also the first album not to feature former member and frequent contributor on piano Ian Stewart, who died shortly before the release of their previous album Dirty Work. It was produced by Richards and Jagger, along with Chris Kimsey, who had previously produced the Stones' 1983 Undercover.

After the relative disappointment of their prior two albums, Steel Wheels was a hit, reaching multi-platinum status in the United States, Top 5 status in numerous markets around the world, and spawning two hit singles: "Mixed Emotions", which peaked at No. 1 in Canada and No. 5 in the United States, and "Rock and a Hard Place", the band's last Top-40 hit in the US. Critics were generally lukewarm towards the album, exemplified by Stephen Thomas Erlewine: "It doesn't make for a great Stones album, but it's not bad, and it feels like a comeback."

Background
Following the release of 1986's Dirty Work, and Jagger's pursuit of a solo career, relations between him and the Stones-committed Richards worsened considerably. While Jagger released the tepidly received Primitive Cool in 1987, Richards recorded Talk Is Cheap, his solo debut, released in 1988 to positive reviews. The two years apart appeared to have healed the wounds sufficiently to begin resurrecting their partnership and band.

Meeting in January 1989, just preceding the Stones' induction into the Rock and Roll Hall of Fame, the chemistry between Jagger and Richards easily outshone whatever differences they had, and after composing some 50 songs in a matter of weeks, Ronnie Wood, Wyman and Charlie Watts were called in to begin recording what would become Steel Wheels, beckoning Undercover co-producer Chris Kimsey to perform the same role.

Recording in Montserrat and London during the spring, Steel Wheels was designed to emulate a classic Rolling Stones sound. One notable exception was "Continental Drift," an Eastern-flavoured piece, with The Master Musicians of Jajouka led by Bachir Attar, recorded in June 1989 in Tangier, coordinated by Cherie Nutting. With much of the past disagreements behind them, sessions for Steel Wheels were fairly harmonious.

Release and reception

The massive, worldwide Steel Wheels Tour was launched in late August 1989, concurrently with Steel Wheels arrival and the release of lead single "Mixed Emotions," a partially biographical reference to Jagger and Richards' recent woes that proved to be the Rolling Stones' last major hit single in the United States, reaching No. 5. Critical reaction was warm, with Steel Wheels reaching No. 2 in the UK and No. 3 in the US where it went double-platinum. Follow-up singles were "Rock and a Hard Place," "Almost Hear You Sigh" and "Terrifying."
The Steel Wheels Tour, which finished in mid-1990 after being re-titled the Urban Jungle Tour, was a financial success. In 1990, FOX aired a 3-D television special of the Steel Wheels tour. Unlike anaglyphic 3-D which requires the familiar red and green glasses, the method used was the Pulfrich Effect which permitted full-colour video. The film was shot by Gerald Marks of PullTime 3-D in NYC. An IMAX film of the tour was released the next year, which still plays sporadically at IMAX venues around the world.

Anthony DeCurtis of Rolling Stone writes "All the ambivalence, recriminations, attempted rapprochement and psychological one-upmanship evident on Steel Wheels testify that the Stones are right in the element that has historically spawned their best music – a murky, dangerously charged environment in which nothing is merely what it seems. Against all odds, and at this late date, the Stones have once again generated an album that will have the world dancing to deeply troubling, unresolved emotions."

Stephen Thomas Erlewine of AllMusic writes "The Stones sound good, and Mick and Keith both get off a killer ballad apiece with "Almost Hear You Sigh" and "Slipping Away," respectively. It doesn't make for a great Stones album, but it's not bad, and it feels like a comeback – which it was supposed to, after all."

In 2000 it was voted number 568 in Colin Larkin's All Time Top 1000 Albums.

The album was the Rolling Stones' first digital recording. In 1994, Steel Wheels was remastered and reissued by Virgin Records, and again in 2009 by Universal Music. An SHM-CD version was released on 2 December 2015 by Universal Japan, mastered from the original British master tape.

Track listing

Personnel
Adapted from Steel Wheels liner notes.

The Rolling Stones
Mick Jagger – lead vocals (except 8 & 12), backing vocals (1, 2, 9, 12), guitar (1, 2, 4–7, 11), harmonica (5, 11), shakers (2, 3), keyboards (10)
Keith Richards – acoustic guitar (10), classical guitar (9), guitar (except 9 & 10), backing vocals (2, 3, 6, 8, 9, 12), lead vocals (8 & 12), bicycle spokes (10)
Ronnie Wood – guitar (2, 3, 5–9, 12), bass guitar (1, 4, 11), acoustic bass (10), dobro (11), backing vocals (9)
Bill Wyman – bass guitar (2, 3, 5–9, 12)
Charlie Watts – drums (all tracks)

Additional musicians
Chuck Leavell – organ (1–3, 6, 8, 12), piano (1, 2, 12), keyboards (7, 9), Wurlitzer (8)
Matt Clifford – electric piano (12), piano (6), keyboards (3, 5, 7, 9, 11), clavinet (8), harmonium (6), percussion programming (10), strings (12)
Sarah Dash – backing vocals (2, 7, 9, 10, 12)
Lisa Fischer – backing vocals (2, 3, 7, 9, 10, 12)
Bernard Fowler – backing vocals (1, 2, 5–10, 12)
Luís Jardim – percussion (2, 6, 8, 9)
Phil Beer – mandolin (6), fiddle (6)
The Kick Horns – brass (1, 2, 7, 12)
Roddy Lorimer – trumpet (3)
The Master Musicians of Jajouka led by Bachir Attar Farafina – African-Moroccan instruments (10)
Sonia Morgan – backing vocals (10)
Tessa Niles – backing vocals (10)
Chris Jagger – literary editor (6, 9)

Technical and design
Recording engineer – Christopher Marc Potter
Assistant engineer – Rupert Coulson
Recorded at Air Studios, Montserrat
Mixed by Michael Brauer, Christopher Marc Potter, Chris Kimsey
Art direction and design – John Warwicker
Logo design – Mark Morton
Mastering – Ted Jensen at Sterling Sound, NYC

Charts

Weekly charts

Year-end charts

Certifications and sales

References

External links

1989 albums
Albums produced by Chris Kimsey
Albums produced by the Glimmer Twins
Rolling Stones Records albums
The Rolling Stones albums
Virgin Records albums
Columbia Records albums
Albums recorded at Olympic Sound Studios
Albums recorded at AIR Studios